Stade Raphaël Babet is a multi-use stadium in Saint-Joseph, Réunion. It is used mostly for soccer matches and is the home stadium for AS Excelsior. The stadium holds 1,130 people.

References 

Football venues in Réunion
AS Excelsior